Salaheddine Saidi ( – born 6 February 1987, Marrakech) is a Moroccan international footballer who plays for Morocco national football team.

Honours

Club

Wydad AC
Botola: 2014–15, 2016–17, 2018–19, 2020–21
CAF Champions League: 2017
CAF Super Cup: 2018

International
Morocco A'
Arab Cup: 2012
African Nations Championship: 2018, 2020

International career

International goals
Scores and results list Morocco's goal tally first.

References

Moroccan footballers
Living people
1987 births
Sportspeople from Marrakesh
Morocco international footballers
AS FAR (football) players
Dubai CSC players
Kawkab Marrakech players
Wydad AC players
Botola players
Moroccan expatriate footballers
Expatriate footballers in the United Arab Emirates
Moroccan expatriate sportspeople in the United Arab Emirates
UAE Pro League players
Association football midfielders
2018 African Nations Championship players
Morocco A' international footballers